Chicken feed is food for chickens

Chickenfeed or Chicken Feed may refer to:
Chicken Feed, 1927 Our Gang short film
Chickenfeed (novel)
Chickenfeed (retail chain)